Watsonia (bugle lily) is a genus of plants in the family Iridaceae, subfamily Crocoideae. Watsonias are native to southern Africa (South Africa, Lesotho, Eswatini). The genus is named after Sir William Watson, an 18th-century British botanist.

Diversity

There are 56 accepted species in southern Africa, with two varieties and about 112 names either unresolved or regarded as synonyms. All are perennial herbs growing from corms and producing erect spikes of showy flowers. Most are fynbos plants, adapted to a Mediterranean-type climate, but some occur along the eastern and inland areas of the country and adapted to a wider range of conditions, mainly continental climate with summer rainfall. Many species occur mainly in the mountains, though some occur in sandy flats and marshy areas.

Cultivation
The most commonly cultivated species is the pink-flowered Watsonia borbonica and its white mutant 'Arderne's White'. These were crossed with Watsonia meriana and other species in the early 20th century by breeders including John Cronin in Australia and Luther Burbank in California to produce a wide range of cultivars.  Watsonia has been eclipsed in popularity by Gladiolus and other bulbs, and is now neglected by the nursery industry.

Distribution
Native to South Africa, Watsonia species were introduced as garden ornamentals to Australia in the mid-19th century and were widely grown by the 1940s.

In the South-West of Western Australia, six species have become naturalised from garden escapes along rivers, wetlands and seasonally wet ground.  In places Watsonia spp. have displaced native understorey flora; concentrations of them create a fire hazard in summer.

Watsonia meriana var. bulbillifera is also a weed in New Zealand, Réunion and Mauritius.

Systematics
The genus comprises 58 species.
 Watsonia aletroides (Burm.f.) Ker Gawl.
 Watsonia amabilis Goldblatt
 Watsonia amatolae Goldblatt
 Watsonia angusta Ker Gawl.
 Watsonia bachmannii L.Bolus
 Watsonia bella N.E.Br. ex Goldblatt
 Watsonia borbonica (Pourr.) Goldblatt
 Watsonia borbonica subsp. ardernei (Sander) Goldblatt
 Watsonia borbonica subsp. borbonica
 Watsonia canaliculata Goldblatt
 Watsonia coccinea (Herb. ex Baker) Baker
 Watsonia confusa Goldblatt
 Watsonia densiflora Baker
 Watsonia distans L.Bolus
 Watsonia dubia Eckl. ex Klatt
 Watsonia elsiae Goldblatt
 Watsonia emiliae L.Bolus
 Watsonia fergusoniae L.Bolus
 Watsonia fourcadei J.W.Mathews & L.Bolus
 Watsonia galpinii L.Bolus
 Watsonia gladioloides Schltr.
 Watsonia humilis Mill.
 Watsonia hysterantha J.W.Mathews & L.Bolus
 Watsonia inclinata Goldblatt
 Watsonia knysnana L.Bolus
 Watsonia laccata (Jacq.) Ker Gawl.
 Watsonia latifolia N.E.Br. ex Oberm.
 Watsonia lepida N.E.Br.
 Watsonia × longifolia J.W.Mathews & L.Bolus
 Watsonia marginata (L.f.) Ker Gawl.
 Watsonia marlothii L.Bolus
 Watsonia meriana (L.) Mill.
 Watsonia meriana var. bulbillifera (J.W.Mathews & L.Bolus) D.A.Cooke
 Watsonia meriana var. meriana
 Watsonia minima Goldblatt
 Watsonia mtamvunae Goldblatt
 Watsonia obrienii V. Tibergen
 Watsonia occulta L.Bolus
 Watsonia paucifolia Goldblatt
 Watsonia pillansii L.Bolus
 Watsonia pondoensis Goldblatt
 Watsonia pulchra N.E.Br. ex Goldblatt
 Watsonia rogersii L.Bolus
 Watsonia rourkei Goldblatt
 Watsonia schlechteri L.Bolus
 Watsonia spectabilis Schinz
 Watsonia stenosiphon L.Bolus
 Watsonia stokoei L.Bolus
 Watsonia strictiflora Ker Gawl.
 Watsonia strubeniae L.Bolus
 Watsonia tabularis J.W.Mathews & L.Bolus
 Watsonia transvaalensis Baker
 Watsonia vanderspuyae L.Bolus
 Watsonia versfeldii J.W.Mathews & L.Bolus
 Watsonia watsonioides (Baker) Oberm.
 Watsonia wilmaniae J.W.Mathews & L.Bolus
 Watsonia wilmsii L.Bolus
 Watsonia zeyheri L.Bolus

See also

 List of plants known as lily

Notes

References
 Goldblatt, P. (1989) The Genus Watsonia. Ann. Kirstenbosch Bot. Gard. 19. (National Botanic Gardens: Cape Town).

External links

Iridaceae genera
Iridaceae
Flora of Southern Africa
Taxa named by Philip Miller